Florida has the eighteenth highest per capita income in the United States of America, at $21,557 (2000).  Its personal per capita income is $30,446 (2003).

Florida counties ranked by per capita income

Florida counties ranked by per capita income from 2006-2010 data.

References

Floria
Economy of Florida
Income